Sonny's Crib is an album by jazz pianist Sonny Clark, released on the Blue Note label in March 1958. It features Donald Byrd, Curtis Fuller, John Coltrane, Paul Chambers, and Art Taylor. The first half of the album comprises three jazz standards, while the second half contains two original compositions by Clark. One writer  has compared the album to Coltrane's Blue Train, recorded two weeks later and which features Fuller and Chambers, as the epitome of the Blue Note sound in the late 1950s.

Critical reception 

Sonny's Crib was rated 3½ stars by Thom Jurek in an Allmusic review which stated "Sonny's Crib is a phenomenal recording, one that opened the door to hard bop becoming the norm in the late '50s, and one that drew deft, imaginative performances from all its players".

Track listing 
 "With a Song in My Heart" (Richard Rodgers, Lorenz Hart) - 7:54
 "Speak Low" (Kurt Weill, Ogden Nash) - 6:50
 "Come Rain or Come Shine" (Harold Arlen, Johnny Mercer) - 7:29
 "Sonny's Crib" (Sonny Clark) - 13:31 
 "News for Lulu" (Sonny Clark) - 8:34
 "With a Song in My Heart" [alternate take] (Rodgers) - 8:47 Bonus track on CD
 "Speak Low" [alternate take] (Weill, Nash) - 6:57 Bonus track on CD
 "Sonny's Crib" [alternate take] - 9:56 Bonus track on CD

Personnel 
Sonny Clark - piano
Donald Byrd - trumpet
Curtis Fuller - trombone
John Coltrane - tenor saxophone
Paul Chambers - bass
Art Taylor - drums

Production 
 Alfred Lion - producer
 Reid Miles - design
 Rudy Van Gelder - engineer
 Francis Wolff - photography

References

Sonny Clark albums
1958 albums
Blue Note Records albums
Albums produced by Alfred Lion
Albums recorded at Van Gelder Studio